Jennifer Fear is the CEO of Step Forward, a London charity aimed at improving the life chances of young people in Tower Hamlets. She has also received a Civic Award for “improved quality of life for local people by providing services, beyond what they are paid to do” in 2017.

Recognition
 Fear was ranked 44th, in 2012, on the Independent on Sunday's Pink List

References

Year of birth missing (living people)
Living people
British charity and campaign group workers